Katariina is a Finnish and Estonian feminine given name. It is a cognate of Catherine. Individuals bearing the name Katariina include:
Katariina Lahti (born 1949), Finnish film director and screenwriter
Katariina Pantila (1981-2010), Finnish nurse and convicted murderer
Katariina Ratasepp (born 1986), Estonian actress
Katariina Souri (born 1968) Finnish author, artist, model 
Katariina Tuohimaa (born 1988), Finnish tennis player
Katariina Unt (born 1971), Estonian actress

Estonian feminine given names
Finnish feminine given names